Harald Victor Hove (born 25 February 1983) is a Norwegian politician for the Conservative Party.

He served as a deputy representative to the Parliament of Norway from Hordaland during the terms 2005–2009 and 2009–2013. In total he met during 19 days of parliamentary session.

References

1983 births
Living people
Conservative Party (Norway) politicians
Deputy members of the Storting
Politicians from Bergen
21st-century Norwegian politicians